Gujanal is a village in Belagavi district in the southern state of Karnataka, India.  It is located 28 km East of District headquarters Belgaum.

References

Villages in Belagavi district